Saint Aloysius' College was an independent Roman Catholic boarding school in Sevenhill, in the Clare Valley region of South Australia. Established in 1856 and closed in 1886, the school was the first Catholic boarding school in South Australia. It also served as a seminary, novitiate and retreat centre. The school was part of the international network of Jesuit schools begun in Messina, Sicily in 1548. It is now part of the Sevenhill Cellars site.

History 
The Austrian Jesuits fled Europe to escape political and religious oppression and established a mission the Mid North and Far North regions of South Australia in 1851. They were based at Sevenhill, South Australia in the Clare Valley, and constructed a short-lived boarding College, Saint Aloyisius College, open between 1856 and 1886. This College is the site of Saint Aloysius, Sevenhill and Sevenhill Cellars. It also makes up one part of the Centre of Ignatian Spirituality.

Saint Aloysius' College began in Sevenhill in 1856, as part of the Jesuit missioning to the colony of South Australia. The college took on boarders, as a boys only college, from places as far away as Victoria, Tasmania and New Zealand.

In 1886 the school was closed, with increasing competition from Christian Brothers College, Adelaide. Its sister schools include Saint Ignatius' College, Adelaide, St Ignatius' College, Riverview, St Aloysius' College and Loyola College, Mount Druitt in Sydney and Xavier College in Melbourne.

See also

 List of schools in South Australia
 Catholic education in Australia
 Education in South Australia

References

Educational institutions established in 1856
1856 establishments in Australia
Educational institutions disestablished in 1886
Mid North (South Australia)
1886 disestablishments in Australia
Defunct Catholic schools in Australia
Defunct schools in South Australia